is a passenger railway station in located in Sakai-ku, Sakai, Osaka Prefecture, Japan, operated by West Japan Railway Company (JR West).

Lines

Station layout
The station consists of two opposed side platforms connected by an elevated station building. The station has a Midori no Madoguchi staffed ticket office.

Platforms

Adjacent stations

History
It became Sakaishi Station on May 1, 1965. With the privatization of the Japan National Railways (JNR) on April 1, 1987, the station came under the aegis of the West Japan Railway Company.

Station numbering was introduced in March 2018 with Sakaishi being assigned station number JR-R28.

Passenger statistics
In fiscal 2019, the station was used by an average of 12,047 passengers daily (boarding passengers only).

Surrounding area
 Sakai City Cultural Center
 Sakai Alphonse Mucha Hall
 Osaka Health and Welfare Junior College
 Sakai City Nagao Junior High School
 Sakai City Mikunioka Junior High School

See also
List of railway stations in Japan

References

External links

 Sakai Station information 

Railway stations in Osaka Prefecture
Railway stations in Japan opened in 1932
Sakai, Osaka